The Boone County Jail is a historic jail building at Central Ave. and Willow St. in Harrison, Arkansas.  It is a two-story red brick building, built in 1914. Its design has been attributed to prominent Arkansas architect Charles L. Thompson.  Its hip roof is finished in red tile, as is the roof of the single-story porch sheltering the main entrance.  The jail was laid out to house the jailer on the first floor, and the prisoners on the second.

It was listed on the National Register of Historic Places in 1976 for its architecture.

See also
Boone County Courthouse (Arkansas), also designed by Thompson and NRHP-listed in Harrison
National Register of Historic Places listings in Boone County, Arkansas

References

Buildings and structures in Harrison, Arkansas
Government buildings completed in 1914
Jails on the National Register of Historic Places in Arkansas
National Register of Historic Places in Boone County, Arkansas
1914 establishments in Arkansas